Programmed is the first album by American heavy metal band Lethal, released in 1990 by Metal Blade Records.

Reception 
In 2005, Programmed was ranked number 414 in Rock Hard magazine's book of The 500 Greatest Rock & Metal Albums of All Time.

Track listing 
 "Fire in Your Skin" – 5:40
 "Programmed" – 3:59
 "Plan of Peace" – 2:57
 "Another Day" – 6:16
 "Arrival" – 4:20
 "What They've Done" – 5:42
 "Obscure the Sky" – 3:58
 "Immune" – 4:58
 "Pray for Me" – 3:07
 "Killing Machine" – 5:36

Personnel 
Tom Mallicoat – vocals
Eric Cook – guitar
Dell Hull – guitar
Glen Cook – bass
Jerry Hartman – drums

References 

1990 debut albums